The U.S. Federal Government is an opponent of the illegal drug trade; however, state laws vary greatly and in some cases contradict federal laws.

The Organization of American States estimated that the revenue for cocaine sales in the U.S. was $34 billion in 2013. The Office of National Drug Control Policy estimates that $100 billion worth of illegal drugs were sold in the U.S. in 2013.

War on Drugs

The "War on Drugs" is a term commonly applied to a campaign of prohibition and foreign military aid and military intervention undertaken by the United States government, with the assistance of participating countries, and the stated aim to define and reduce the illegal drug trade. This initiative includes a set of drug policies of the United States that are intended to discourage the production, distribution, and consumption of illegal psychoactive drugs. The term was first used by U.S. President Richard Nixon, and was later popularized by the media.

Minors
The U.S. government's most recent 2005 National Survey on Drug Use and Health (NSDUH) reported that nationwide over 800,000 adolescents ages 12–17 sold illegal drugs during the twelve months preceding the survey.  The 2005 Youth Risk Behavior Survey by the U.S. Centers for Disease Control and Prevention (CDC) reported that nationwide 25.4% of students had been offered, sold, or given an illegal drug by someone on school property.  The prevalence of having been offered, sold, or given an illegal drug on school property ranged from 15.5% to 38.8% across state CDC surveys (median: 26.1%) and from 20.3% to 40.0% across local surveys (median: 29.4%).

Despite over US$7 billion spent annually towards arresting  and prosecuting nearly 800,000 people across the country for marijuana offenses in 2005 (FBI Uniform Crime Reports), the federally funded Monitoring the Future Survey reports about 85% of high school seniors find marijuana “easy to obtain.” That figure has remained virtually unchanged since 1975, never dropping below 82.7% in three decades of national surveys.

In 2009, the Justice Department identified more than 200 U.S. cities in which Mexican drug cartels "maintain drug distribution networks or supply drugs to distributors"- up from 100 three years earlier.

Women

Women are often involved in the illegal drug trade in the United States, typically in marginal, low-level roles.

Controversies

Smuggling 

Monitoring 
Environmental monitoring can be used to map trafficking. Trafficking of a substance tends to incidentally, disproportionately increase its nearby usage, and thus excretion. This has been used to quantify trafficking into this country, and has also highlighted routes of smuggling through nearby countries which feed this country's large market  for example, Martinique.

See also
Bureau of Alcohol, Tobacco, Firearms, and Explosives (ATF)
Drug Enforcement Administration (DEA)
Federal Bureau of Investigation (FBI)
Immigration and Customs Enforcement (ICE)
United States Customs and Border Protection (CBP)

References

External links
 Drug Enforcement Administration (DEA)

 
United States